The Prva HNL Player of the Year award was an annual association football award given by the Croatian newspaper Slobodna Dalmacija. It was awarded to the best football player who plied his trade in the Prva HNL (or "1. HNL"), Croatian top flight and winners were chosen by the newspaper's sports editors. Winners for the preceding year were usually announced around 1 January and all players who had spent the entire calendar year playing in the league were eligible for the award, regardless of their nationality. The award was established in 1992 and lasted until 2010 when it was awarded for the last time.

Igor Cvitanović holds the record for most wins with three awards won between 1992 and 1997, followed by Stipe Pletikosa and Niko Kranjčar with two wins each. The current award holder is Sammir of Dinamo Zagreb.

Another similar award is the Yellow Shirt Award which is based on aggregate player ratings in matches throughout the season as judged by the country's only sports daily Sportske novosti.

Winners
† denotes shared wins

Notes on club name changes:
Dinamo Zagreb changed their name to "HAŠK Građanski" in June 1991 and then again in February 1993 to "Croatia Zagreb". They reverted to "Dinamo Zagreb" in February 2000.
The NK Varteks changed their 52-year-old name to "NK Varaždin" in June 2010, then folded in 2015. Two newer clubs, both unassociated with the defunct team, use the defunct club's names: NK Varteks (founded 2011) and NK Varaždin (founded 2012 as "Varaždin ŠN", picked up the "NK Varaždin" name when the older club folded).

See also
Sportske novosti Yellow Shirt award, for the HNL footballer of the year, given by the Croatian sport newspaper Sportske novosti, chosen by sport journalists.
Prva HNL Player of the Year (Tportal), given by the Croatian web site Tportal, chosen by captains of league clubs.
Football Oscar, given by the Croatian union Football syndicate, chosen by players and managers of league clubs.

References

External links
Complete list of winners 1992–2009

Croatian football trophies and awards
Awards established in 1992
 
1992 establishments in Croatia
Annual events in Croatia
Awards disestablished in 2010
2010 disestablishments in Croatia
Association football player non-biographical articles